Christopher Raymond Jack (born 5 September 1978) is a former New Zealand rugby union player who played as a lock. He played for Canterbury and the Tasman Mako in the National Provincial Championship and its successor, the Air New Zealand Cup; the Crusaders in Super Rugby; Saracens in the Guinness Premiership; and internationally for the New Zealand national team, the All Blacks.

Rugby career
His test debut for the All Blacks was against Argentina on 23 June 2001 in Christchurch. With his size and athleticism, he established himself as a regular in the All Blacks side.

It was announced on 7 June 2006 that Jack had signed a two-year contract with the newly formed Tasman Rugby Union. He spent two years with the English Premiership side Saracens joining after the 2007 Rugby World Cup, joining another New Zealand player, Glen Jackson.

In April 2009 he re-signed with the New Zealand Rugby Union until 2011. He played with South African side Western Province and then made a return to Super 14 side Crusaders for the 2010 season.

Current life 
Retiring in 2015, Jack has taken up a builders apprenticeship. Based in Nelson, Jack has also taken up the position as the Nelson Child Cancer Foundation ambassador. His father is also involved in the building industry.

Achievements
In 2002, Jack was named the New Zealand rugby player of the year.

Other
 Scored a try 11 minutes after coming on as a replacement against Argentina on his international debut in 2001.
 Scored a try in New Zealand’s opening match of the RWC 2007 against Italy.
 Played in six RWC matches, five in 2003 and one in 2007.

References

External links
 

1978 births
Living people
Rugby union players from Christchurch
New Zealand rugby union players
Rugby union locks
Tasman rugby union players
Saracens F.C. players
Western Province (rugby union) players
New Zealand international rugby union players
Canterbury rugby union players
Crusaders (rugby union) players
New Zealand expatriate rugby union players
Expatriate rugby union players in England
Expatriate rugby union players in South Africa
New Zealand expatriate sportspeople in South Africa
New Zealand expatriate sportspeople in England
People educated at Shirley Boys' High School
Kyuden Voltex players
New Zealand expatriate sportspeople in Japan
Expatriate rugby union players in Japan